Boxing competitions at the 2015 European Games were held from 16 to 27 June 2015 at the Crystal Hall 3 venue in the main Games cluster in Baku. The competition consisted of ten weight events for men, and five for women, and was contested, as at the Olympic Games, under rules and formats set out by the AIBA.

Baku served as the first of two European qualification events for the AIBA World Boxing Championships, itself the largest qualification event for the 2016 Summer Olympics. The finalists, and the bronze medalist defeated by the eventual champion achieve one quota place for their country at the World Championships.

Qualification

Nations are limited to one entry per weight division. Azerbaijan will have host nation positions available in each weight category

Qualification systems have not been finalised for the men's events, but should use the same format that has been adopted by the IOC, according to organisers.

In the women's events, the EUBC 2014 Women's European Amateur Boxing Championships in Bucharest, Romania will be the official qualification event after which European ranking will be established by 30 June 2014. If an NOC has more than one athlete in the top 14, the next best ranked NOC will get the allocation. 2 other place per weight category are reserved for 'universality' and host nominations.

Medal summary

Men

Women

Medal table

References

 
Sports at the 2015 European Games
2015 in boxing
Euro
2015 in women's boxing
2015